Francesco Laporta (born 10 October 1990) is an Italian professional golfer who plays on the European Tour. He won two tournaments on the 2019 Challenge Tour.

Amateur career 
Laporta started playing as a 13-year old at the San Domenico Golf in Brindisi and developed his amateur career in Italy and South Africa. After playing in a few professional tournaments in the Alps Tour as an amateur, he turned professional in 2013 on the Sunshine Tour.

Professional career 
Between 2013 and 2015 Laporta played full time in the Sunshine Tour, reaching his best career professional finish with a tie for second at the 2013 Zimbabwe Open where he also set a course record. At the end of 2015, Laporta earned his 2016 European Tour card at the Qualifying School.

Laporta's best result in the 2016 European Tour season came at the Trophée Hassan II where finished T-22, after leading the competition after two rounds. He lost his card at the end of the season after finishing 189th in the Order of Merit.

From 2017 to 2019 Laporta has played on the Challenge Tour. He finished 48 in the Order of Merit in 2017 and 52nd in 2018. His best finish in those two seasons was to be tied for third place in the 2017 Barclays Kenya Open. Laporta started 2019 well when he was runner-up in the opening event of the season, the Turkish Airlines Challenge, losing in a sudden-death playoff to Connor Syme. In October he finished tied for 7th place in the Italian Open to earn his biggest prize. The following week he won the Hainan Open, finishing a stroke ahead of Robin Roussel, a result that guaranteed him promotion to the European Tour for 2020. In November 2019 he won the Challenge Tour Grand Final, taking the Order of Merit title.

Professional wins (3)

Challenge Tour wins (2)

1Co-sanctioned by the China Tour

Challenge Tour playoff record (0–1)

Italian Pro Tour wins (1)

Team appearances
Amateur
European Amateur Team Championship (representing Italy): 2011

Professional
European Championships (representing Italy): 2018

See also
2015 European Tour Qualifying School graduates
2019 Challenge Tour graduates

References

External links

Italian male golfers
European Tour golfers
Sportspeople from the Metropolitan City of Bari
1990 births
Living people